Paracomotis is a genus of moths belonging to the family Tortricidae.

Species
Paracomotis smaragdophaea (Meyrick, 1932)

References
tortricidae.com

Tortricidae genera
Taxa named by Józef Razowski
Tortricinae